Louder Than War is a music and culture website and magazine focusing on mainly alternative arts news, reviews, and features. The site is an editorially independent publication that was started by journalist John Robb in 2010 and is now run by a team of other journalists with a worldwide team of freelancers.  There has been a print edition since 2015.

The site is built around live reviews, album reviews and interviews. In 2012, Louder Than War launched a record label to promote and champion lesser known bands and artists.

History
In its first year, in November 2011, Robb was voted to win the UK Association of Independent Music "Indie Champion" award.

Louder Than War created the record label Louder Than War Records in 2014, to act as a platform for bands and artists to reach a wider audience; the first release being Evil Blizzard 'The Dangers Remixes', a 300 copy CD only release without a catalogue number, each being hand numbered; the 8 track releases being a remix of the at that point still to be released Evil Blizzard debut 'The Dangers of Evil Blizzard' (LOUD001).
The label has since gone on to release material by King Champion Sounds, Faerground Accidents, The Nightingales, Super Besses, Get Your Gun, and The Membranes.

In August 2015, Louder Than War announced they were also creating a print/magazine  The first issue of Louder Than War magazine was published by Big Cheese Publishing Ltd in autumn 2015 and followed a similar style and format to the website.

Sarah Lay became editor in September 2015, with John Robb becoming Editor-in-Chief of the online and offline publications. Lay left in July 2017. The website continues to be run by Robb and Associate Editor Phil Newall and a team of other section editors, journalists and contributors worldwide.

In October 2021, Louder Than War Radio was launched, broadcasting 24/7 on the internet. Presenters include, Nigel Carr, Gordon Rutherford, Brian McCabe, Neil Crud, Nils van der Linden and Audrey Golden.

Section editors

Head of Photography/Live and Festivals Editor: Melanie Smith
Interviews & Features/Other Editor – Nigel Carr
Reviews Editor (album / EP / single / video) – Wayne Carey
Festivals Editor – Naomi Dryden-Smith

References

External links

Cultural magazines published in the United Kingdom
Online magazines published in the United Kingdom
Music magazines published in the United Kingdom
Magazines established in 2010
Alternative magazines
British music websites